Fang Wanyi (1732-1779), was a Chinese poet and painter. She married the painter Luo Pin in 1752, and painted several works both with him as well as alone, of which many were exhibited in Beijing during her lifetime and became famous.

References 
 Lily Xiao Hong Lee,Clara Lau,A.D. Stefanowska: Biographical Dictionary of Chinese Women: v. 1: The Qing Period, 1644-1911 

1732 births
1779 deaths
18th-century Chinese poets
Qing dynasty painters
Chinese women poets
Qing dynasty poets
18th-century Chinese women artists
18th-century Chinese painters